The Aksu Dam, sometimes referred to as Aksu-Anakol Dam, is a hydropower dam in the preliminary stages of construction near the town of Aksu on the Çoruh River in Erzurum Province, Turkey. It will have an installed capacity of 160 MW.

The 114 m high embankment dam is part of the Çoruh Development Plan, a 17-dam-cascade hydropower scheme designed to tap Çoruh River's hydropower potential. Aksu Dam will be located immediately upstream Arkun Dam (237 MW), and immediately downstream Güllübağ Dam (96 MW), both of which are already operational. 

It is expected to generate an average 382.5 GWh of electric power annually, which will contribute to 3.78% of Çoruh basin' hydropower generation and 0.54% of Turkey's.

Its construction is supervised by Turkey's State Hydraulic Works. Construction on access roads and diversion tunnels began in 2010.

See also

Güllübağ Dam – upstream
Arkun Dam – downstream

References

Dams in Erzurum Province
Hydroelectric power stations in Turkey
Dams on the Çoruh River
Rock-filled dams
Proposed hydroelectric power stations
Proposed renewable energy power stations in Turkey